The 1960 All-Eastern football team consists of American football players chosen by various selectors as the best players at each position among the Eastern colleges and universities during the 1960 NCAA University Division football season. 

The 1960 All-Eastern team included two Heisman Trophy winners. Joe Bellino of Army won the award in 1960, and Ernie Davis of Syracuse won it in 1961.

Backs  
 Paul Terhes, Bucknell (AP-1)
 Joe Bellino, Navy (AP-1)
 Al Rozycki, Dartmouth (AP-1)
 Ernie Davis, Syracuse (AP-1)

Ends 
 Mike Ditka, Pittsburgh (AP-1)
 Fred Mautino, Syracuse (AP-1)

Tackles 
 S. Barber, Penn State (AP-1)
 M. Pyle, Yale (AP-1)

Guards 
 Al Vanderbush, Army (AP-1)
 B. Balme, Yale (AP-1)

Center 
 Alex Kroll, Rutgers (AP-1)

Key
 AP = Associated Press
 UPI = United Press International

See also
 1960 College Football All-America Team

References

All-Eastern
All-Eastern college football teams